Ancistrocerus is a widely distributed genus of potter wasps present in many biogeographical regions of the world. They are nonpetiolate eumenine wasps with a transverse ridge at the bending summit of the first metasomal tergum and with a low and opaque propodeal lamella completely fused to the submarginal carina.

The name of this genus (meaning "hooked horn" for the back-curved last segments of the antennae characteristic of males of this genus and most other potter wasp genera) has been widely used as root in the construction of many other genus-level names for potter wasps with a nonpetiolated metasoma and normally bearing a transverse ridge on the first metasomal tergum, such as Ancistroceroides, Parancistrocerus, Orancistrocerus, Tachyancistrocerus, etc.

Species
There are currently 175 recognized species in the genus.

 Ancistrocerus abditus Ancistrocerus acanthopus Ancistrocerus adenensis Ancistrocerus adiabatus Ancistrocerus agilis Ancistrocerus andreinii Ancistrocerus androcles Ancistrocerus angulata Ancistrocerus antilope Ancistrocerus antoni Ancistrocerus arcanus Ancistrocerus aristae Ancistrocerus assamensis Ancistrocerus atlanticus Ancistrocerus atropos Ancistrocerus auctus Ancistrocerus aureovillosus Ancistrocerus baluchistanensis Ancistrocerus behrensi Ancistrocerus beieri Ancistrocerus belizensis Ancistrocerus biphaleratus Ancistrocerus birenimaculatus Ancistrocerus bolivianus Ancistrocerus boreanus Ancistrocerus borneanus Ancistrocerus budongo Ancistrocerus burensis Ancistrocerus bustamente Ancistrocerus caelestimontanus Ancistrocerus camicrus Ancistrocerus campestris Ancistrocerus capensis Ancistrocerus carinicollis Ancistrocerus catskill Ancistrocerus cervus Ancistrocerus chotanensis Ancistrocerus cingulatus Ancistrocerus claripennis Ancistrocerus contrarius Ancistrocerus coreanus Ancistrocerus cupreipennis Ancistrocerus danticoides Ancistrocerus densepilosellus Ancistrocerus dolosus Ancistrocerus domesticus Ancistrocerus durangoensis Ancistrocerus dusmetiolus Ancistrocerus ebusianus Ancistrocerus epicus Ancistrocerus erythropus Ancistrocerus extremus Ancistrocerus fasciaticollis Ancistrocerus ferghanicus Ancistrocerus ferrugineoclypeatus Ancistrocerus flavomarginatus Ancistrocerus fluvialis Ancistrocerus fortunatus Ancistrocerus frigidus Ancistrocerus fukaianus Ancistrocerus fulvitarsis Ancistrocerus gazella Ancistrocerus geae Ancistrocerus haematodes Ancistrocerus handschini Ancistrocerus hangaicus Ancistrocerus heirinus Ancistrocerus hirsutus Ancistrocerus ichneumonideus Ancistrocerus impunctatus Ancistrocerus isla Ancistrocerus japonicus Ancistrocerus kazbekianus Ancistrocerus kenyaensis Ancistrocerus kerneri Ancistrocerus khangmarensis Ancistrocerus kitcheneri Ancistrocerus krausei Ancistrocerus laminiger Ancistrocerus leleji Ancistrocerus lindemanni Ancistrocerus lineaticollis Ancistrocerus lineativentris Ancistrocerus longipilosus Ancistrocerus longispinosus Ancistrocerus lucasius Ancistrocerus lufirae Ancistrocerus lutonidus Ancistrocerus maculiscapus Ancistrocerus madaera Ancistrocerus managuaensis Ancistrocerus maroccanus Ancistrocerus massaicus Ancistrocerus massanensis Ancistrocerus matangensis Ancistrocerus melanocerus Ancistrocerus melanurus Ancistrocerus microcynoeca Ancistrocerus minnesotaensis Ancistrocerus mongolicus Ancistrocerus monstricornis Ancistrocerus montuosus Ancistrocerus morator Ancistrocerus multipictus Ancistrocerus neavei Ancistrocerus neuvillei Ancistrocerus nigricapitus Ancistrocerus nigricornis Ancistrocerus nilensis Ancistrocerus ochraceopictus Ancistrocerus oviventris Ancistrocerus pakistanus Ancistrocerus palaestinicus Ancistrocerus paracallosus Ancistrocerus parapoloi Ancistrocerus parietinus Ancistrocerus parietum Ancistrocerus parredes Ancistrocerus pelias Ancistrocerus philippinus Ancistrocerus pilosus Ancistrocerus punjabensis Ancistrocerus quebecensis Ancistrocerus raddei Ancistrocerus reconditus Ancistrocerus reflexus Ancistrocerus renimacula Ancistrocerus rhipheus Ancistrocerus rhodensis Ancistrocerus rivularis Ancistrocerus robertsianus Ancistrocerus roubaudi Ancistrocerus rubrotinctus Ancistrocerus rufoluteus Ancistrocerus rufopictus Ancistrocerus sabahensis Ancistrocerus santa-annae Ancistrocerus satyrus Ancistrocerus scoticus Ancistrocerus septemfasciatus Ancistrocerus serenus Ancistrocerus sichelii Ancistrocerus sikhimensis Ancistrocerus similis Ancistrocerus simulator Ancistrocerus sounkionis Ancistrocerus spilogaster Ancistrocerus spinolae Ancistrocerus stevensoni Ancistrocerus stevensonii Ancistrocerus striativentris Ancistrocerus tahoensis Ancistrocerus taikonus Ancistrocerus tardinotus Ancistrocerus tenebrosus Ancistrocerus tenellus Ancistrocerus terayamai Ancistrocerus terekensis Ancistrocerus thalassarctos Ancistrocerus tibetanus Ancistrocerus tinctipennis Ancistrocerus tityrus Ancistrocerus trichionotus Ancistrocerus trifasciatus Ancistrocerus triphaleratus Ancistrocerus tuberculocephalus Ancistrocerus tussaci Ancistrocerus unifasciatus Ancistrocerus unimarginatus Ancistrocerus vigilans Ancistrocerus waldenii Ancistrocerus waltoni Ancistrocerus xanthodesmus Ancistrocerus xanthozonus Ancistrocerus zebra''

References

Potter wasps
Articles containing video clips